Tribhuvan University's Institute of Agriculture and Animal Science (IAAS) is the oldest institute in Nepal which provides higher education in agriculture and animal science.

Overview

IAAS was founded in Kathmandu in 1957 as a school of agriculture to train junior technical assistants. In 1968, the school was upgraded to a college of agriculture. Four years later it became affiliated with  Tribhuvan University (TU), and moved to Rampur, Chitwan in 1974. The institute's mission is to provide higher education in agriculture and agricultural development, focusing on teaching, research, and continuing education. The government of Nepal established the Agriculture and Forestry University (AFU) in Rampur in 2010, and AFU took over IAAS' physical plant and other assets. The IAAS dean's office moved to Kathmandu in 2011 and continues its programs and activities at satellite offices in Sanepa, Lalitpur and Kirtipur.

The institute's postgraduate program was moved to Kathmandu in 2013, and classes are conducted in TU's Research Centre for Applied Science and Technology (RECAST) building in Kirtipur and other TU classrooms. It has a Master of Science in Agriculture (M. Sc. Ag.) program in seven departments, Master of Science in Animal Science (M.Sc. An. Sc.) and Master of Veterinary Science (M. V. Sc.) programs in two, and two Ph.D. programs (Plan A and Plan B) in several departments. In Plan A, students attend theory and practical classes in relevant subjects offered by the department. In Plan B, students conduct research and submit a progress report each semester; classes and practical work are not mandatory.

The institute has collaborated with the TU central library in Kirtipur, and student access to the library has been ensured. It has donated a number of postgraduate reference books, and the library has committed to obtain books and other publications required by IAAS students. In addition to maintaining its laboratory, the institute has signed in an agreement with the Nepal Agricultural Research Council (NARC) for student practical work and research activities. The institute has involved TU professors and researchers and other governmental and non-governmental organizations.

Campuses

The Paklihawa campus is in Siddharthanagar, and the Lamjung campus is in Sundarbazar. They were established as branches of the central Rampur campus in 1976 (2032 B.S.) with the following objectives:
 To produce mid-level agricultural technicians
 To conduct relevant, problem-solving agricultural and animal-science research for farmers
 To provide technical assistance in agriculture and animal science to farmers.

With the establishment of AFU at IAAS, Rampur, both satellite IAAS campuses (Lamjung and Paklihawa, which had two-year programs) were upgraded to B.Sc.Ag. programs in 2012. The Paklihawa campus began a five-year B.V.Sc. program in 2013.

Affiliated colleges

TU and IAAS became affiliated with agricultural colleges in Gokuleshwar, Baitadi (2010), Lamahi Municipality and Tulsipur, Dang (both 2014).

Tribhuvan University's other technical institutes are:
 Institute of Engineering
 Institute of Forestry
 Institute of Medicine
 Institute of Science and Technology

Links to other institutions 
Memoranda of understanding have been signed between IAAS and national and international institutions, including the International Maize and Wheat Improvement Center (CIMMYT), Agro Enterprise Centre (AEC), Ministry of Agricultural and Livestock Development, Nepal Agriculture Research Council (NARC), International Centre for Integrated Mountain Development, Cornell University, University of Graz, Hiroshima University, Writtle College, Asian Institute of Technology, Association of Nepalese Agricultural Professionals of Americas and Tufts University.

Land 
The institute has 338 ropani (229 hectares) of land in six plots. It has one horticulture, one agronomy and one livestock farm covering 252 ropani (171 hectares). The farms produce fruit, vegetables, cereals, animals and birds and are used for practical work. The upland farm includes a mango orchard, and about 4,200 coffee plants were planted in August 2005.

Administration and staff 
The campus chief is the head of the institute for general and academic administration, accounts, store, library, farms, hostels and dispensary work. There is a branch head of each section, responsible for internal management. Major decisions related to rules and regulations in each section are made by section heads and related personnel, headed by the campus chief.

There are 150 teaching staff members, and 56 in administrative support. Two teachers have Ph.D. degrees, and others hold master's degrees. Four teachers have been brought from Rampur on a contract basis each year.

Buildings 
The institute has two administrative buildings, a library, six classrooms and five laboratories. There are 24 dormitories and residences (one chief, nine senior staff, ten junior staff and four lower staff), a guest house, a men's hostel, a women's hostel and two mess halls. There are also a poultry house, a goat shed, two cattle-buffalo sheds, a swine shed, a farm store, an auditorium, a garage and a dispensary.

Academic activities 
During its early years, the institute offered a one-year I. Sc. (Basic science) Agriculture course, producing 947 mid-level agricultural technicians from 1975 to 1983. The institute began a non-academic Junior Technical Assistant training program in 1984, and 644 JTAs were trained from 1984 to 1990. It began a two-year I. Sc. (basic science) Agriculture diploma program in 1991, and produced 313 JTs by 2001. In 2002, the institute introduced an eight-semester Bachelor of Science in Agriculture program.

Departments 
IAAS has 18 departments:
Agricultural Extension and Rural Sociology
Agricultural Economics
Agronomy
Soil Science and Agricultural Engineering
Horticulture
Plant Breeding
Agri-botany
Animal Breeding and Biotechnology
Animal Nutrition and Fodder Production
Aquaculture
Entomology
Livestock Production and Management
Plant Pathology
Veterinary Anatomy, Physiology and Biochemistry
Veterinary Medicine, Pharmacology and Surgery
Veterinary Microbiology, Parasitology and Epidemiology
Veterinary Pathology, Theriogeonology and Clinic
Agricultural Statistics and Mathematics

Publications 
IAAS publishes the annual Journal of the Institute of Agriculture and Animal Science, presenting scientific information on plant, animal and social sciences. IAAS Research Reports is based on research, and the M.Sc. Thesis Abstract covers postgraduate theses.

References

External links
 Official website
 IAAS Journal online

Agricultural universities and colleges in Nepal
Animal research institutes
Science and technology in Nepal
Tribhuvan University
Veterinary schools in Nepal
1957 establishments in Nepal